Apple vs. 7G is the debut remix album by British producer A. G. Cook. It compiles reworked versions of songs from his first two albums 7G and Apple, both released in 2020. It was released on 28 May 2021 by Cook's label PC Music.  A deluxe "Silver Edition" includes 7 extra tracks and is exclusively available for purchase on Bandcamp. Many of the remixes featured were premiered on various compilation albums, DJ mixes or hidden zip files prior to Apple vs. 7G's release. The album was promoted by seven singles.

Background and release 
A remix album was hinted at before the release of both 7G and Apple in an interview with Crack Magazine stating that hyperpop duo 100 gecs were working on one of his upcoming singles. The future of this remix's release is unclear.

It was later teased days before Apple's release with the announcement of the "Beautiful Superstar" 12", which includes Easyfun's remix of the aforementioned single. "The Darkness (Remix) (with Sarah Bonito and Hannah Diamond)" later leaked in December 2020, when digital media store Boomkat uploaded the track to their site early. 

The full album was announced on 7 May 2021. Cook began releasing singles from Apple vs. 7G on 9 April 2021, starting with "Beautiful Superstar (Easyfun Remix)". This was followed by the releases of "Oh Yeah (Caroline Polachek Remix)", "2021 (umru Remix)", "The Darkness (Remix) (with Sarah Bonito and Hannah Diamond", and "Xcxoplex (with Charli XCX)", all released within a week of each other. Oklou's cover of "Being Harsh" was released as a single on 20 May, followed by No Rome's remix of "Windows" on 27 May, the day before the album's release.

Track listing 
All tracks written and produced by Cook, except where noted.
Notes

 signifies an additional producer
  signifies a remixer
"Silver vs. Silver" is a mashup of Cook's "Silver" and PC Music artist Astra King's cover of Cook's "Silver".

Sample credits

 "2021 (umru Remix)" contains samples of "Silver" and "Oracle", songs from Cook's 7G album.
 "The Darkness (Extended Remix)" contains samples of "Fade Away", performed by Hannah Diamond, written by Hannah Amond and Cook, "The Princess and the Clock", performed by Kero Kero Bonito, written by Gus Lobban, "Shy", performed by Hannah Diamond, written by Amond and Cook, "Make Believe", performed by Hannah Diamond, written by Amond, Cook and Finn Keane, and "Build it Up", performed by Kero Kero Bonito, written by Lobban, Jamie Bulled, Sarah Bonito and Cook.

References

2021 remix albums
Albums produced by A. G. Cook 
Albums produced by Caroline Polachek 
PC Music albums